The 2018 Women's Euro Winners Cup was the third edition of the Women's Euro Winners Cup (WEWC), an annual continental beach soccer tournament for women's top-division European clubs. The championship is the sport's version of the UEFA Women's Champions League in association football.

Organised by Beach Soccer Worldwide (BSWW), the tournament was held in Nazaré, Portugal from 28 May till 3 June 2018, in tandem with the larger men's edition.

The event began with a round robin group stage. At its conclusion, the best teams progressed to the knockout stage, a series of single elimination games to determine the winners, starting with the Round of 16 and ending with the final. Consolation matches were also played to determine other final rankings.

Havana Shots Aargau of Switzerland were the defending champions, but were knocked out in the quarter-finals by WFC Zvezda of Russia, ultimately finishing in 8th place. WFC Zvezda went on to win their first title, beating Portsmouth Ladies of the England in the final, Pompey's second runners-up finish in a row.

Teams

20 teams entered the tournament – all of whom enter straight into the group stage.

12 different nations are represented.

Qualification
As per BSWW regulations, qualification for the 2018 WEWC is achieved as follows:

The reigning champions qualify automatically (Havana Shots Aargau of Switzerland).
The winners of all European national women's beach soccer leagues/championships are entitled to automatic qualification. (Note that no league champion from Switzerland qualified as this was Havana Shots Aargau who had already qualified as current WEWC champions)
In countries where women's clubs exist but a national women's league or championship does not yet exist, one club can be nominated to represent that country.
If a national association wishes to enter more than one club, they can request for permission to do so from the organisers BSWW who will grant or reject the clubs a berth at the tournament depending on the total number of teams already registered.

Entrants
Key: H: Hosts \ TH: Title holders

Venues

Three venues were used in one host city: Nazaré, Leiria District, Portugal.
Matches took place at Praia de Nazaré (Nazaré Beach) on one of three pitches:

Host of 12 matches; all main bracket ties from the quarter-finals onwards and all host club (Sporting CP) matches.

Host of 24 matches; all Round of 16 ties and all losers brackets ties from the quarter-finals onwards.

Host of 26 matches; only used during the group stage.

Squads
Each club must submit a squad of a maximum of 12 players that includes a minimum of two goalkeepers. Players are to be assigned shirt numbers between 1 and 22 (the number 1 must be reserved for a goalkeeper). Three delegates must accompany the players, including at least one medical personnel. A maximum of three foreign players are allowed to be part of the squad. This was later increased to four, however a maximum of three of these players are permitted to play in a match.

Draw
The draw for the group stage took place on May 9 at 12:00 local time in Nazaré, Portugal at the Biblioteca Municipal de Nazaré (Nazaré Public Library), conducted by the Mayor of Nazaré, Walter Chicharro, PFP Director Pedro Dias, BSWW Deputy Vice-President, Gabino Renales and BSWW Head of Competitions, Josep Ponset.

The BSWW organising committee decided to split the 20 teams into five groups of four, conducting the draw as follows:

Group stage
The group stage fixtures were announced on 16 May.

All times are local, WEST (UTC+1).

Group A

Group B

Group C

Group D

Group E

Knockout stage
The top three clubs from each group, plus the best fourth placed team advance to the Round of 16.

In the knockout stage, the clubs compete in single-elimination matches. Consolation matches are also played to determine the final rankings involving the clubs knocked out of each round of the knockout stage.

Round of 16 draw:
The Round of 16 draw was conducted on 30 May following the conclusion of the day's matches. The 16 clubs were placed into two pots of eight. The five group winners and the three best runners-up (Lady Grembach EE Łódź, Amnéville & Roses Platja) were placed in Pot 1. The remaining two runners-up, the five third-placed teams and the best fourth-placed club were assigned to Pot 2.

For each Round of 16 tie, a club from Pot 1 was drawn to play against a club from Pot 2. However, clubs who finished 1st and 2nd in the same group could not be drawn against each other. As each tie was drawn, they were allocated chronologically from top to bottom in the bracket below. The draw was conducted by the Mayor of Nazaré, Walter Chicharro and Dario Ramacciotti of Viareggio.

Round of 16

Quarter-finals

9th–16th place

1st–8th place

Semi-finals

13th–16th place

9th–12th place

5th–8th place

1st–4th place

Finals

15th place match

13th place match

11th place match

9th place match

7th place match

5th place match

3rd place match

Championship final

Awards
The following individual awards were presented after the final.

Top goalscorers
Players who scored at least 5 goals

14 goals

 Melissa Gomes ( Amnéville)

12 goals

 Molly Clark ( Portsmouth Ladies)
 Natalia de Francisco Gomez ( Higicontrol Melilla)

11 goals

 Gemma Hillier ( Portsmouth Ladies)

10 goals

 Federica Marino ( Lokrians)

9 goals

 Adri ( Lady Grembach EE Łódź)

8 goals

 Katie James ( Portsmouth Ladies)
 Alba Mellado ( Madrid)
 Carla Morera ( Roses Platja)

7 goals

 Saki Kushiyama ( Lady Grembach EE Łódź)
 Jade Widdowson ( Portsmouth Ladies)
 Carolina González ( AIS Playas de San Javier)

6 goals

 Mariana Rosa ( Sporting CP)
 Noele Bastos ( Terracina Ladies)
 Laura Del Río ( Madrid)
 Anastasiia Gorshkova ( WFC Zvezda)
 Andrea Miron ( AIS Playas de San Javier)
 Anna Cherniakova ( WFC Zvezda)

5 goals

 Sandra Genovesi ( Havana Shots Aargau)
 Sarah Kempson ( Portsmouth Ladies)
 Louisa Meza ( Sporting CP)
 Lorena Asensio ( Higicontrol Melilla)
 Maria Soto ( Higicontrol Melilla)
 Marta Stodulska ( Lady Grembach EE Łódź)
 Silvia Ferrer ( Roses Platja)
 Selene Alegre ( Femenino Cáceres)
 Celine van Velsen ( HTC Zwolle)

Source

Final standings

See also
2018 Euro Winners Cup (men's edition)

References

External links
Women's Euro Winners Cup 2018, at Beach Soccer Worldwide
Euro Winners Cup Women 2018, at Beach Soccer Russia (in Russian)

Women's Euro Winners Cup
Euro
2018
2018 in beach soccer
Nazaré, Portugal
Women's Euro Winners Cup
Women's Euro Winners Cup